The year 1955 in film involved some significant events.


Top-grossing films (U.S.)

The top-grossing hits of 1955 in the United States.

Top-grossing films by country
The highest-grossing 1955 films from countries outside of North America.

Events
 January 7 – U.K. release of the Halas and Batchelor film animation of George Orwell's Animal Farm (completed April 1954), the first full-length British-made animated feature on general theatrical release.
February 24 - 12th Golden Globe Awards announced: On The Waterfront, Marlon Brando, & Judy Garland win
 March 18 – The film adaptation of Evan Hunter's novel Blackboard Jungle previews in New York City, featuring the single "Rock Around the Clock" by Bill Haley & His Comets over the opening credits, the first use of a rock and roll song in a major film. Teenagers jump from their seats to dance to it.
 June 1 – Premiere of Billy Wilder's film of The Seven Year Itch featuring an iconic scene of Marilyn Monroe standing on a New York City Subway grating as her white dress is blown above her knees.
 June 16 – Lady and the Tramp, the Walt Disney company's 15th animated film, premieres in Chicago, the first animated feature filmed in the CinemaScope widescreen process. Peggy Lee co-writes and sings the songs.
 June 27 – The last Republic serial, King of the Carnival, is released.
 July 18 – Disneyland opens to the public in Anaheim, California.
 September 30 – American actor James Dean dies in an automobile collision near Cholame, California, age 24. On October 27, the film Rebel Without a Cause, in which he stars, is released.
 October 11 – Theatrical release in the United States of the Rodgers and Hammerstein musical film Oklahoma!, the first feature photographed in the Todd-AO 70 mm widescreen process.
 November 3 – The musical film Guys and Dolls, starring Marlon Brando and Frank Sinatra, is premiered in New York City.
 November 22 – The death of Shemp Howard requires use of a Fake Shemp to complete The Three Stooges films which he has commenced.
 December – United Artists quit the Motion Picture Association of America over the decision to deny The Man With the Golden Arm a Production Code seal.
 December 7 – The film Picnic starring William Holden and Kim Novak is released.

Awards

1955 film releases

January–March
January 1955
January 1
Young at Heart
January 26
The Violent Men
January 29
 The Americano 
January 31 
 Abbott and Costello Meet the Keystone Kops
February 1955
February 2
 Battle Cry
February 8 
Cinerama Holiday
March 1955
March 1
Untamed
March 4
Hit the Deck
March 20
Blackboard Jungle
March 23
Revenge of the Creature
March 24
The Glass Slipper
March 25
 Strategic Air Command

April–June
April 1955
A Man Called Peter
April 10
East of Eden
Marty
April 13
Rififi (France)
April 20
Violent Saturday
April 24
Godzilla Raids Again (Japan)
May 1955
May 6
The Prodigal 
May 11
Bride of the Monster
May 25
Davy Crockett: King of the Wild Frontier
May 30
Cult of the Cobra
June 1955
June 1
Son of Sinbad
June 3
 The Seven Year Itch
June 4
 The Sea Chase
June 10
5 Against the House
This Island Earth
June 15
The Beast with a Million Eyes
June 17
King Dinosaur
June 22
Lady and the Tramp
Land of the Pharaohs
June 23
 Abbott and Costello Meet the Mummy
Date unknown
Footsteps in the Fog

July–September
July 1955
July 7
We're No Angels
July 13
Foxfire
July 22
How to Be Very, Very Popular
The Night of the Hunter
July 30
Mister Roberts
Pete Kelly's Blues
Dates Unknown
Not as a Stranger
It Came From Beneath the Sea
August 1955
August 3
To Catch a Thief
August 5
Journey to the Beginning of Time
The King's Thief
August 14
Half Human (Japan)
August 17
To Hell and Back
August 25
 You're Never Too Young
August 26
The Quatermass Xperiment
September 1955
September 22
The Tall Men
September 30
The Trouble with Harry

October–December

October 1955
October 7
Trial
October 11
Oklahoma!
October 19
The Treasure of Pancho Villa
October 29
Rebel Without a Cause
November 1955
November 3
Guys and Dolls
November 7
Artists and Models
November 23
The Adventures of Quentin Durward
December 1955
December 7
Picnic 
The Last Frontier
December 12
The Rose Tattoo
December 13
Richard III
December 15
The Man with the Golden Arm
December 22
The Court-Martial of Billy Mitchell
Tarantula!
December 25
All That Heaven Allows
I'll Cry Tomorrow
Date unknown
Day the World Ended
The Phantom from 10,000 Leagues

Top ten money making stars

Notable films released in 1955
United States unless stated

#
 5 Against the House, starring Kim Novak, Guy Madison, Brian Keith

A
 Abbott and Costello Meet the Keystone Kops, starring Bud Abbott and Lou Costello, featuring an appearance by Mack Sennett
 Abbott and Costello Meet the Mummy, starring Bud Abbott and Lou Costello
 Above Us the Waves, starring John Mills – (GB)
 The Adventures of Quentin Durward, starring Robert Taylor, Kay Kendall
 Ain't Misbehavin', starring Piper Laurie, Rory Calhoun, Mamie Van Doren
 All That Heaven Allows, directed by Douglas Sirk, starring Jane Wyman and Rock Hudson
 The Americano, starring Glenn Ford
 Le Amiche (The Girlfriend), directed by Michelangelo Antonioni – (Italy)
 Anděl na horách (Angel in the Mountains) – (Czechoslovakia)
 Apache Ambush, starring Richard Jaeckel
 Artists and Models, starring Dean Martin, Jerry Lewis, Dorothy Malone, Shirley MacLaine
 Azaad, starring Dilip Kumar – (India)

B
 Bad Day at Black Rock, directed by John Sturges, starring Spencer Tracy, Robert Ryan, Walter Brennan
 Battle Cry, starring Van Heflin, Aldo Ray, Anne Francis
 The Beast with a Million Eyes 
 Bedevilled, starring Anne Baxter and Steve Forrest
 The Big Combo, starring Cornel Wilde, Richard Conte, Brian Donlevy, Jean Wallace
 The Big Knife, starring Jack Palance, Ida Lupino, Jean Hagen, Rod Steiger, Shelley Winters
 Blackboard Jungle, starring Glenn Ford, Anne Francis, Louis Calhern, Sidney Poitier, Vic Morrow, Richard Kiley
 Blood Alley, starring John Wayne and Lauren Bacall
 A Bullet for Joey, starring Edward G. Robinson and George Raft

C
 Captain Lightfoot, starring Rock Hudson
 Carrington V.C., starring David Niven – (GB)
 Cast a Dark Shadow, starring Dirk Bogarde – (GB)
 Chief Crazy Horse, starring Victor Mature
 Cinerama Holiday
 Ciske de Rat (aka A Child Needs Love) – (Netherlands)
 The Cobweb, directed by Vincente Minnelli, starring Richard Widmark, Gloria Grahame, Lauren Bacall, Charles Boyer, Lillian Gish
 The Cockleshell Heroes, directed by and starring José Ferrer, with Trevor Howard – (GB)
 The Colditz Story, directed by Guy Hamilton, starring John Mills and Eric Portman – (GB)
 Confession, directed by Ken Hughes, starring Sydney Chaplin – (GB)
 The Constant Husband, starring Rex Harrison, Margaret Leighton, Kay Kendall – (GB)
 Count Three and Pray, starring Van Heflin, Joanne Woodward and Raymond Burr
 The Counterfeit Coin – (Greece)
 The Court-Martial of Billy Mitchell, directed by Otto Preminger, starring Gary Cooper, Ralph Bellamy, Rod Steiger, Elizabeth Montgomery
 El Coyote
 Crashout, starring Arthur Kennedy and William Bendix
 The Criminal Life of Archibaldo de la Cruz (Ensayo de un Crimen), directed by Luis Buñuel – (Mexico)

D
 Daddy Long Legs, starring Fred Astaire and Leslie Caron
 The Dam Busters, starring Richard Todd and Michael Redgrave, with an early role by Robert Shaw – (GB)
 Davy Crockett, King of the Wild Frontier, starring Fess Parker and Buddy Ebsen
 Death of a Cyclist (Muerte de un ciclista), directed by Juan Antonio Bardem – (Spain)
 The Deep Blue Sea, starring Vivien Leigh – (GB)
 The Desperate Hours, starring Humphrey Bogart and Fredric March
 Devdas, based on novel with same name, starring Dilip Kumar, Vyjayanthimala, Suchitra Sen – (India)
 Les Diaboliques (The Devils), directed by Henri-Georges Clouzot, starring Simone Signoret – (France)
 Dreams (Kvinnodröm), directed by Ingmar Bergman, starring Eva Dahlbeck – (Sweden)

E
 East of Eden, directed by Elia Kazan, starring Julie Harris, James Dean (in his first major role), Raymond Massey
 The Enchanted Boy (Zakoldovanyy malchik) – (USSR)
 Escuela de vagabundos (School for Tramps), starring Pedro Infante – (Mexico)

F
 The Far Horizons, starring Fred MacMurray, Charlton Heston, Donna Reed, Barbara Hale
 The Fast and the Furious, starring John Ireland and Dorothy Malone
 Female on the Beach, starring Joan Crawford, Jeff Chandler, Jan Sterling
 Fire in the Night (Det brenner i natt!) – (Norway)
 Floating Clouds (Ukigumo) – (Japan)
 Footsteps in the Fog, starring Stewart Granger and Jean Simmons – (GB)
 Foxfire, starring Jane Russell
 Francis in the Navy, starring Donald O'Connor and Martha Hyer, with Clint Eastwood in an early role

G
 Galapagos, a documentary by Thor Heyerdahl – (Norway)
 A Generation (Pokolenie), directed by Andrzej Wajda – (Poland)
 The Girl in the Red Velvet Swing, directed by Richard Fleischer, starring Ray Milland, Joan Collins, Farley Granger – (U.S.)
 The Girl Rush, starring Rosalind Russell, Fernando Lamas, Gloria DeHaven
 Godzilla Raids Again (Gojira no Gyakushū) – (Japan)
 Good Morning, Miss Dove, starring Jennifer Jones and Robert Stack
 The Good Soldier Schweik, animation directed by Jiří Trnka – (Czechoslovakia)
 Guys and Dolls, directed by Joseph L. Mankiewicz, starring Marlon Brando, Jean Simmons, Frank Sinatra, Vivian Blaine

H
 Hell on Frisco Bay, starring Alan Ladd and Edward G. Robinson
 Hell's Island, starring John Payne and Mary Murphy
 Heroes of Shipka (Geroite na Shipka) – (Bulgaria/USSR)
 The Hidden One (La Escondida), starring Pedro Armendáriz – (Mexico)
 Hit the Deck, directed by Roy Rowland,  starring Jane Powell, Debbie Reynolds, Ann Miller, Tony Martin, Vic Damone
 House of Bamboo, starring Robert Ryan
 How to Be Very, Very Popular, starring Betty Grable in her final film role

I
 I Am a Camera, starring Julie Harris and Laurence Harvey – (GB)
 I Died a Thousand Times, starring Jack Palance, Shelley Winters, Earl Holliman, Lee Marvin
 I Live in Fear (Ikimono no kiroku), directed by Akira Kurosawa – (Japan)
 I'll Cry Tomorrow, starring Susan Hayward
 Illegal, a film noir starring Edward G. Robinson and Jayne Mansfield
 Interrupted Melody, starring Eleanor Parker and Glenn Ford
 It Came from Beneath the Sea, starring Kenneth Tobey and Faith Domergue, with special effects by Ray Harryhausen
 It Happened on July 20th (Es geschah am 20. Juli), directed by G. W. Pabst, starring Bernhard Wicki – (Austria)
 It's Always Fair Weather, starring Gene Kelly, Dan Dailey, Michael Kidd, Cyd Charisse

J
 Jedda, directed by Charles Chauvel – (Australia)
 John and Julie, starring Moira Lister and Sid James – (GB)
 Journey to the Beginning of Time (Cesta do Pravěku) – (Czechoslovakia)
 Jupiter's Darling, directed by George Sidney, starring Esther Williams and Howard Keel

K
 Kanyasulkam, starring N. T. Rama Rao – (India)
 The Kentuckian, directed by and starring Burt Lancaster, featuring film debut of Walter Matthau
 Killer's Kiss, directed by Stanley Kubrick
 The King's Thief, starring Ann Blyth and David Niven
 Kiss Me Deadly, directed by Robert Aldrich, starring Ralph Meeker as Mickey Spillane's Mike Hammer

L
 Lady and the Tramp, an animated Disney musical featuring voice of Peggy Lee
 Lady Godiva of Coventry, starring Maureen O'Hara
 The Ladykillers, directed by Alexander Mackendrick, starring Alec Guinness, Cecil Parker, Herbert Lom, Peter Sellers – (GB)
 Land of the Pharaohs, starring Joan Collins and Jack Hawkins
 The Last Frontier, directed by Anthony Mann, starring Victor Mature, Robert Preston, Anne Bancroft
 The Last Ten Days (Der letzte Akt), directed by G. W. Pabst – (Austria/West Germany)
 The Left Hand of God, starring Humphrey Bogart and Gene Tierney
 Little Red Monkey, directed by Ken Hughes – (Britain)
 Lola Montès, directed by Max Ophüls – (France)
 The Long Gray Line, starring Tyrone Power and Maureen O'Hara
 Love Is a Many-Splendored Thing, starring William Holden and Jennifer Jones
 Love Me or Leave Me, starring Doris Day and James Cagney
 Love Never Dies (El Amor nunca muere) – (Argentina)
 Lucy Gallant (reissued as Oil Town), starring Jane Wyman

M
 Magic Fire, starring Alan Badel
 Mambo, directed by Robert Rossen, starring Silvana Mangano, Vittorio Gassman, Shelley Winters – (U.S./Italy)
 A Man Alone, directed by and starring Ray Milland, with Mary Murphy
 The Man from Laramie, directed by Anthony Mann, starring James Stewart
 The Man Who Loved Redheads, starring Moira Shearer – (GB)
 The Man with the Golden Arm, directed by Otto Preminger, starring Frank Sinatra, Eleanor Parker, Darren McGavin, Kim Novak, Arnold Stang
 Man with the Gun, starring Robert Mitchum
 Man Without a Star, starring Kirk Douglas and William Campbell
 Marty, directed by Delbert Mann, starring Ernest Borgnine, Betsy Blair, Joe Mantell, Frank Sutton, Jerry Paris
 The McConnell Story, starring Alan Ladd and June Allyson
 The Mill of Good Luck (La 'Moara cu noroc') – (Romania)
 Miracle of Marcelino (Marcelino Pan Y Vino) – (Spain)
 Missamma, starring N. T. Rama Rao – (India)
 Mister Roberts, co-directed by John Ford and Mervyn LeRoy, starring Henry Fonda, James Cagney, William Powell, Jack Lemmon
 Moonfleet, starring Stewart Granger and Joan Greenwood
 Mr. & Mrs. '55, starring Guru Dutt and Madhubala – (India)
 Mr. Arkadin, directed by and starring Orson Welles – (France/Spain/Switzerland)
 My Sister Eileen, starring Janet Leigh and Betty Garrett

N
 New York Confidential, starring Broderick Crawford, Richard Conte, Marilyn Maxwell, Anne Bancroft
 Night and Fog, a documentary directed by Alain Resnais – (France)
 The Night My Number Came Up, starring Michael Redgrave – (GB)
 The Night of the Hunter, directed by Charles Laughton, starring Robert Mitchum, Shelley Winters, Lillian Gish, Peter Graves
 Not as a Stranger, starring Robert Mitchum, Olivia de Havilland, Frank Sinatra, Gloria Grahame, Broderick Crawford, Lon Chaney, Jr.

O
 Oh, Ibuku (O, My Mother), directed by Ali Joego, debuting Aminah Cendrakasih – (Indonesia)
 Oklahoma! (first film shot in widescreen process known as Todd-AO), starring Gordon MacRae, Shirley Jones, Rod Steiger, Gloria Grahame
 Ordet (The Word), directed by Carl Theodor Dreyer – (Denmark)
 Our Best Days (Ayyamna al-Holwa), starring Omar Sharif – (Egypt)
 Out of the Clouds, directed by Basil Dearden, starring Anthony Steel, Robert Beatty – (U.K.)

P
 Passage Home, directed by Roy Ward Baker, starring Anthony Steel, Peter Finch, Diane Cilento – (U.K.)
 Pather Panchali (Song of the Little Road), directed by Satyajit Ray – (India)
 Pete Kelly's Blues, starring Jack Webb, Janet Leigh, Edmond O'Brien, Peggy Lee
 The Phenix City Story, starring Richard Kiley, John McIntire, John Larch, James Edwards, Edward Andrews
 Picnic, directed by Joshua Logan, starring William Holden, Kim Novak, Cliff Robertson, Rosalind Russell
 Prince of Players, starring Richard Burton
 Princess Yang Kwei-Fei (aka Yôkihi) – (Japan)
 The Prisoner, directed by Peter Glenville, starring Alec Guinness and Jack Hawkins – (GB)
 The Private War of Major Benson, starring Charlton Heston
 The Prodigal, starring Lana Turner

Q
 The Quatermass Xperiment – (GB)
 Queen Bee, starring Joan Crawford

R
 The Racers, starring Kirk Douglas, Gilbert Roland, Bella Darvi
 Radio Stories (Historias de la radio) – (Spain)
 Die Ratten (The Rats), starring Maria Schell and Curd Jürgens – (West Germany) – Golden Bear award
 Rage at Dawn, starring Randolph Scott
 The Rains of Ranchipur, starring Lana Turner and Richard Burton
 Rebel Without a Cause, directed by Nicholas Ray, starring James Dean, Sal Mineo, Natalie Wood
 Red Fish (Los peces rojos), starring Arturo de Córdova – (Spain)
 Richard III, directed by and starring Laurence Olivier, with Ralph Richardson, Claire Bloom, John Gielgud – (GB)
 Rififi (Du rififi chez les hommes), directed by Jules Dassin – (France)
 A Ripple in the Pond (Ena votsalo sti limni) – (Greece)
 Romeo and Juliet (Romeo i Dzhulyetta), starring Yuri Zhdanov and Galina Ulanova – (USSR)
 Roots (Raíces) – (Mexico)
 The Rose Tattoo, starring Anna Magnani and Burt Lancaster
 Run for Cover, starring James Cagney, John Derek, Ernest Borgnine

S
 Samurai II: Duel at Ichijoji Temple (Zoku Miyamoto Musashi: Ichijōji no kettō) – (Japan)
 Scandal in Sorrento (Pane, amore e...), starring Vittorio De Sica and Sophia Loren – (Italy)
 The Scarlet Coat, starring Cornel Wilde, George Sanders, Anne Francis
 The Sea Chase, starring John Wayne and Lana Turner
 Seagulls Die in the Harbour (Meeuwen sterven in de haven) – (Belgium)
 Seema, starring Nutan – (India)
 Seven Angry Men, starring Raymond Massey
 The Seven Little Foys, starring Bob Hope, featuring James Cagney reprising role of George M. Cohan from Yankee Doodle Dandy
 The Seven Year Itch, directed by Billy Wilder, starring Marilyn Monroe and Tom Ewell
 Shree 420, directed by and starring Raj Kapoor, with Nargis – (India)
 The Shrike, directed by and starring José Ferrer
 The Sign of Venus (Il segno di Venere), starring Sophia Loren and Vittorio De Sica – (Italy)
 Simba, starring Dirk Bogarde – (GB)
 Sissi, starring Romy Schneider – (Austria)
 Six Bridges to Cross, starring Tony Curtis
 Smiles of a Summer Night (Sommarnattens leende), directed by Ingmar Bergman – (Sweden)
 Son of Sinbad
 So This Is Paris, starring Tony Curtis and Gloria DeHaven
 The Spoilers, starring Anne Baxter and Jeff Chandler
 Strategic Air Command, starring James Stewart
 Stella, directed by Michael Cacoyannis, starring Melina Mercouri – (Greece)
 Storm Over the Nile, starring Anthony Steel and Laurence Harvey – (U.K.)
 Summertime, directed by David Lean, starring Katharine Hepburn, Rossano Brazzi, Darren McGavin – (Britain/U.S.)
 The Swindle (Il bidone), directed by Federico Fellini, starring Broderick Crawford – (Italy)

T
 Taira Clan Saga (Shin Heike Monogatari), directed by Kenji Mizoguchi – (Japan)
 Tall Man Riding, starring Randolph Scott and Dorothy Malone
 The Tall Men, starring Clark Gable, Jane Russell, Robert Ryan
 Tarantula, directed by Jack Arnold, starring John Agar, Mara Corday, with Clint Eastwood in a bit part
 The Tender Trap, starring Frank Sinatra, Debbie Reynolds, David Wayne, Celeste Holm
 That Lady, starring Olivia de Havilland – (GB/Spain)
 This Island Earth, directed by Joseph M. Newman, starring Jeff Morrow, Rex Reason,  Faith Domergue, Russell Johnson
 Three for the Show, starring Betty Grable
 Tight Spot, starring Ginger Rogers, Edward G. Robinson, Brian Keith, Lorne Greene
 To Catch a Thief, directed by Alfred Hitchcock, starring Cary Grant and Grace Kelly
 To Hell and Back, starring Audie Murphy, Marshall Thompson, Charles Drake, David Janssen
 The Phantom from 10,000 Leagues, starring Kent Taylor, Cathy Downs, Michael Whalen
 The Treasure of Pancho Villa, starring Rory Calhoun and Shelley Winters
 Trial, starring Glenn Ford
 The Trouble with Harry, directed by Alfred Hitchcock, starring Edmund Gwenn, John Forsythe, Shirley MacLaine

U
 Unknown Soldier (Tuntematon sotilas) – (Finland)
 Unchained, starring Barbara Hale
 Underwater!, starring Jane Russell
 Untamed, starring Tyrone Power and Susan Hayward

V
 The Violent Men, starring Glenn Ford, Barbara Stanwyck, Edward G. Robinson, Brian Keith
 Violent Saturday, starring Victor Mature, Ernest Borgnine, Lee Marvin
 The Virgin Queen, starring Bette Davis, Richard Todd, Joan Collins

W
 We're No Angels, starring Humphrey Bogart, Peter Ustinov, Aldo Ray, Basil Rathbone
 White Feather, starring Robert Wagner, Jeffrey Hunter, Debra Paget
 Wichita, starring Joel McCrea
 The Woman in the Painting (Amici per la pelle) – (Italy)
 Women's Prison, starring Ida Lupino, Jan Sterling, Audrey Totter, Phyllis Thaxter

Y
 You're Never Too Young, starring Dean Martin and Jerry Lewis

Serials
 The Adventures of Captain Africa
 King of the Carnival
 Panther Girl of the Kongo

Short film series
 Looney Tunes (1930–1969)
 Terrytoons (1930–1964)
 Merrie Melodies (1931–1969)
 Popeye (1933–1957)
 Donald Duck (1934–1956)
 The Three Stooges (1934–1959)
 Tom and Jerry (1940–1958)
 Bugs Bunny (1940–1962)
 Mighty Mouse (1942–1955)
 Chip 'n' Dale (1943–1956)
 Droopy (1943–1958)
 Yosemite Sam (1945–1963)
 Ranger Don (1953–1956)
 Speedy Gonzales (1953–1968)

Cartoon:
 Good Will to Men (MGM Cartoon Series) (Frederick Quimby, William Hanna and Joseph Barbera, producers; MGM)
 The Legend of Rockabye Point (Walter Lantz Productions; Universal-International)
 No Hunting (Donald Duck Series) (Walt Disney Productions; RKO Radio)
 Speedy Gonzales (Merrie Melodies Series) (Warner Bros. Cartoons, Inc.; Warner Bros.)

One-Reel:
 Gadgets Galore (Warner Varieties Series) (Robert Youngson, producer; Warner Bros.)
 Survival City (Movietone CinemaScope Series) (Edmund Reek, producer; Twentieth Century-Fox)
 3rd Ave. El (Carson Davidson Productions; Ardee Films)
 Three Kisses (Topper Special Series) (Justin Herman, producer; Paramount)

Two-Reel:
 The Battle of Gettysburg (Dore Schary, producer; MGM)
 The Face of Lincoln (University of Southern California Presentation; Cavalcade Pictures, Inc.)
 On The Twelfth Day...(United Kingdom Series) (Go Pictures, Inc.; George Brest and Associates)
 Switzerland (People and Places Series) (Walt Disney Productions; Buena Vista)
 24-Hour Alert (Cedric Francis, producer; Warner Bros.)

Births
 January 4 - Sergei Kolesnikov (actor), Soviet-Russian actor
 January 6 – Rowan Atkinson, English comedian and actor
 January 9 – J. K. Simmons, American actor
 January 18 – Kevin Costner, American actor, producer and director
 January 19 - Paul Rodriguez (actor), Mexican-American actor and stand-up comedian
 January 20 – Wyatt Knight, American actor (d. 2011)
 January 28 - Lorenzo Caccialanza, American actor
 February 5 - Kenji Ohba, Japanese actor
 February 7 – Miguel Ferrer, American actor (d. 2017)
 February 8 - Ethan Phillips, American actor
 February 9 - Jim J. Bullock, American actor and comedian
 February 15 – Christopher McDonald, American actor
 February 19 – Jeff Daniels, American actor
 February 21 – Kelsey Grammer, American actor and comedian
 February 28 – Gilbert Gottfried, American stand-up comedian, actor and voice actor (d. 2022)
 March 3 – Riina Hein, Estonian actress, director, producer and screenwriter 
 March 6
Larry Cedar, American actor
James Saito, Japanese-American actor
 March 9 – Ornella Muti, Italian actress
 March 13 - Glenne Headley, American actress (d. 2017)
 March 16 - Kuh Ledesma, Filipino actress and singer
 March 17
Mark Boone Junior, American character actor
Gary Sinise, American actor, producer and director
 March 19 – Bruce Willis, American actor
 March 22 – Lena Olin, Swedish actress
 March 28 - Reba McEntire, American country singer, songwriter, actress, and record producer
 March 29 - Brendan Gleeson, Irish actor and film director
 April 3 - Tomas Arana, American actor
 April 6 – Michael Rooker, American actor
 April 8 - Kane Hodder, American actor and stuntman
 April 23 – Judy Davis, Australian actress
 April 24 – Michael O'Keefe, American actor
 April 29 - Leslie Jordan, American actor, comedian, writer and singer (d. 2022)
 April 30 – Zlatko Topčić, Bosnian screenwriter
 May 9 - Kevin Peter Hall, American actor (d. 1991)
 May 10 - Larry "Flash" Jenkins, American actor, director, producer and screenwriter (d. 2019)
 May 15 - Lee Horsley, American actor
 May 16 – Debra Winger, American actress
 May 17 – Bill Paxton, American actor (d. 2017)
 May 18 – Chow Yun-fat, Hong Kong actor
 May 27 - Richard Schiff, American actor and director
 May 31
Susie Essman, American actress
Julio Oscar Mechoso, American actor (d. 2017)
 June 2 – Dana Carvey, American actor and comedian
June 6 - Cheryl Smith, American actress and musician (d. 2002)
 June 7 – William Forsythe, American actor
 June 8
Griffin Dunne, American actor and director
Andrew Stevens, American actor and producer
 June 15
Polly Draper, American actress, writer, producer and director
Julie Hagerty, American actress
Andy Tennant, American screenwriter, director and actor
 June 16 – Laurie Metcalf, American actress
 June 25 - Michael McShane, American actor, singer and improvisational comedian
 June 26 - Gedde Watanabe, American actor and comedian
 June 27 – Isabelle Adjani, French actress
 July 3 - Jesse Corti, American actor
 July 9
Lisa Banes, American actress (d. 2021)
Jimmy Smits, American actor
 July 21 – Béla Tarr, Hungarian director
 July 22 – Willem Dafoe, American actor
 July 28 - Dey Young, American actress
 August 3 – Corey Burton, American voice actor
 August 4 – Billy Bob Thornton, American actor, director and screenwriter
 August 7 – Wayne Knight, American actor and comedian
 August 13 - Paul Greengrass, British director, producer and screenwriter
 August 19 – Peter Gallagher, American actor
 August 20 - Jay Acovone, American actor
 August 24 - Kevin Dunn, American actor
 August 27 – Diana Scarwid, American actress
 September 9 - Edward Hibbert, American-born British actor
 September 10 - Giannina Facio, Costa Rican actress
 September 12 - Peter Scolari, American actor (d. 2021)
 September 17 - Charles Martinet, American actor and voice actor
 September 20 - Betsy Brantley, American actress
 September 21 - Rick Aiello, American actor (d. 2021)
 September 26 - Mark Nelson (actor), American actor and director
 October 17 - Sam Bottoms, American actor and producer (d. 2008)
 October 20 – Thomas Newman, American composer
 October 21 - Catherine Hardwicke, American director and screenwriter
 October 22 - Bill Condon, American director and screenwriter
 October 27 - Michael Shamus Wiles, American character actor
 November 5 - Nestor Serrano, American actor
 November 9
Karen Dotrice, British actress
Thomas F. Duffy, American actor
 November 10 - Roland Emmerich, German director, screenwriter and producer
 November 13 – Whoopi Goldberg, American actress and comedian
 November 15 - Jun Kunimura, Japanese actor
 November 23 - Peter Douglas, American actor and producer
 November 25 - Bruce Hopkins (actor), New Zealand actor
 November 27 - Bill Nye, American television presenter
 November 30 - Kevin Conroy, American actor (d. 2022)
 December 2 – Dennis Christopher, American actor
 December 3
Melody Anderson, Canadian actress
Steven Culp, American actor
 December 6 - Steven Wright, American stand-up comedian, actor, writer and film producer
 December 8 - Kevin McNulty (actor), Canadian actor
 December 9 - Hiroyuki Watanabe, Japanese actor (d. 2022)
 December 16 - Xander Berkeley, American actor
 December 17 - Richard Young (actor), American character actor, filmmaker and screenwriter
 December 24
Clarence Gilyard, American actor (d. 2022)
Grand L. Bush, American former actor

Deaths
 February 11 – Ona Munson, 55, American actress, Five Star Final, Gone with the Wind
 February 12
 Tom Moore, 71, Irish-American actor, Forever Amber, Road House
 S. Z. Sakall, 72, Hungarian actor, Casablanca, Yankee Doodle Dandy
 April 7 – Theda Bara, 69, American silent film actress, A Fool There Was, Cleopatra
 April 25 – Constance Collier, 77, British actress, Stage Door, Rope
 May 4 – Robert Kent, 46, American actor, Blonde Comet, The Phantom Rider
 May 13 – Betty Ann Davies, 44, British actress, My Old Duchess, The Man in Black
 May 22 - Richard "Skeets" Gallagher, 63, American actor, Possessed, Idiot's Delight
 June 11 – Walter Hampden, 75, American actor, Sabrina, The Hunchback of Notre Dame
 July 31 – Robert Francis, 25, American actor, The Caine Mutiny, The Long Gray Line, airplane accident
 August 5 – Carmen Miranda, 46, Brazilian singer and actress, Copacabana, The Gang's All Here
 August 6 – Janet Beecher, 70, American actress, The Story of Vernon and Irene Castle, The Mark of Zorro
 August 10 – Jane Murfin, 70, American screenwriter, What Price Hollywood?, The Women
 August 12 – Lynne Carver, 38, American actress, Everybody Sing, Young Dr. Kildare
 September 20 –
 Robert Riskin, 58, American screenwriter, It Happened One Night, Mr. Deeds Goes to Town
 Noel M. Smith, 60, American director, Secret Service of the Air, Cattle Town
 September 30 – James Dean, 24, American actor, Rebel Without a Cause, East of Eden, automobile accident
 October 1 – Charles Christie, 75, Canadian pioneer film studio owner
 October 9 – Alice Joyce, 65, American actress, The Green Goddess, White Man
 October 19 – John Hodiak, 41, American actor, Lifeboat, A Bell for Adano, heart attack
 October 20 – Frank Darien, 79, American actor, The Grapes of Wrath, Under Fiesta Stars
 November 9 – Tom Powers, 65, American actor, Double Indemnity, The Blue Dahlia
 November 14 – Robert E. Sherwood, 59, American screenwriter, The Best Years of Our Lives, Rebecca
 November 15 – Lloyd Bacon, 65, American director, The Oklahoma Kid, Knute Rockne, All American
 November 22 – Shemp Howard, 60, American actor, comedian of The Three Stooges, The Bank Dick, Pittsburgh
 November 27 – William Nigh, 74, American director, Mr. Wong, Detective, The Gay Cavalier
 December 5 – Paul Harvey, 73, American actor, April in Paris, Calamity Jane
 December 24 – Nana Bryant, 67, American actress, Public Enemies, Bathing Beauty

Film Debuts  
Clint Eastwood – Revenge of the Creature
Dennis Hopper – Rebel Without a Cause
Jill Ireland – No Love for Judy
Shirley Jones – Oklahoma!
Cloris Leachman – Kiss Me Deadly
George Leech – The Ladykillers
Len Lesser – Shack Out on 101
Shirley MacLaine – The Trouble with Harry
Walter Matthau – The Kentuckian
Dick Miller – Apache Woman
Jerry Orbach – Marty
Claude Rich – The Grand Maneuver
Maximilian Schell – Children, Mother, and the General
Paul Scofield – That Lady
Lois Smith – East of Eden
Jack Weston – The Ladykillers
Joanne Woodward – Count Three and Pray

Notes

References

 
Film by year